Alfred Metcalf Jackson (July 14, 1860 – June 11, 1924) was a U.S. Representative from Kansas.

Born in South Carrollton, Kentucky, Jackson attended the common schools and West Kentucky College, and then studied law.  He was admitted to the bar and practiced.  He moved to Howard, Kansas, in 1881 and engaged in the practice of law.  He served as prosecuting attorney of Elk County in 1890.  He served as judge of the thirteenth judicial district of Kansas in 1892.  He moved to Winfield, Kansas, in 1898.

Jackson was elected as a Democrat to the Fifty-seventh Congress (March 4, 1901 – March 3, 1903).  While in Congress he introduced a bill proposing government ownership of telegraph lines which attracted considerable attention.  He was an unsuccessful candidate for reelection in 1902, but in 1904 Jackson was a delegate to the Democratic National Convention that nominated Alton B. Parker and Henry G. Davis.  He resumed the practice of law in Winfield, Kansas, and died there on June 11, 1924.  He was interred at the Highland Mausoleum in Winfield.

Notes

References
 

1860 births
1924 deaths
People from Muhlenberg County, Kentucky
American prosecutors
Kansas lawyers
Kansas state court judges
Democratic Party members of the United States House of Representatives from Kansas
People from Elk County, Kansas
People from Winfield, Kansas
19th-century American lawyers